Khalid Askri (born 20 March 1981) is a Moroccan footballer who plays as a goalkeeper for Raja Casablanca. He played for FAR Rabat for over 12 years.

Career

FAR Rabat 
At the 2010 Moroccan Throne Cup, in a match against MAS Fez, Askri blocked a penalty shootout but failed to grab the ball and instead went to celebrate his save. Meanwhile, the ball spun into the goal and Rabat lost the penalty shootout with a score of 7-6.

Raja Casablanca 
Askri contributed to Casablanca's win against Clube Atlético Mineiro by preventing two goals from Fernandinho and Jô. Casablanca's win brought them to the 2013 FIFA Club World Cup finals against FC Bayern Munich.

References

External links 

AS FAR (football) players
Moroccan footballers
1981 births
Living people
People from Missour
Raja CA players
2013 Africa Cup of Nations players
Chabab Rif Al Hoceima players
Association football goalkeepers
Morocco international footballers
Morocco A' international footballers
2014 African Nations Championship players